Chih-ko  is a village in Chipwi Township in Myitkyina District in the Kachin State of north-eastern Burma.

References

Populated places in Kachin State
Chipwi Township